Charles Cayzer may refer to:

Sir Charles Cayzer, 1st Baronet (1843–1916), British politician, MP for Barrow-in-Furness 1892–1906
Sir Charles William Cayzer, 2nd Baronet (1869–1917) of the Cayzer baronets
Sir Charles William Cayzer, 3rd Baronet (1896–1940), British politician, MP for Chester, 1922–1940
Charles Cayzer (businessman) (born 1957), son of Herbert Robin Cayzer, 2nd Baron Rotherwick

See also
Cayzer baronets